Roy Conli is an American film producer and voice actor. He won the Academy Award for Best Animated Feature for the 2014 Walt Disney Animation Studios film Big Hero 6 at the 87th Academy Awards in 2015.

Early life
Born Roy Salvatore Conli (true surname Coniglione of Italian descent), he graduated from California State Polytechnic University, Pomona (Cal Poly Pomona) in 1983 and majored in Drama.

Filmography

Feature films

Television

Notes

References

External links 
 

Living people
American film producers
American people of Italian descent
California State Polytechnic University, Pomona alumni
Walt Disney Animation Studios people
Year of birth missing (living people)
Producers who won the Best Animated Feature Academy Award